Aleksandr Brednev (born 6 June 1988) is a Russian sprinter. He competed in the 100 metres event at the 2013 World Championships in Athletics.

References

External links
 

1988 births
Living people
Place of birth missing (living people)
Russian male sprinters
World Athletics Championships athletes for Russia
Russian Athletics Championships winners